Juan Camilo Roa Estrada (born 14 November 1994) is a Colombian footballer who plays as a midfielder for Jaguares de Córdoba on loan from Atlético Junior in the Categoría Primera A.

Honours

Club
Uniautónoma
Primera B (1): 2013
Junior
Copa Colombia (1): 2017

External links
 

Living people
1994 births
People from Atlántico Department
Colombian footballers
Association football midfielders
Cortuluá footballers
Atlético Junior footballers
Jaguares de Córdoba footballers
Categoría Primera A players
Categoría Primera B players